Cancroidea is a superfamily of crabs, comprising the families Atelecyclidae and Cancridae. Four other families have been separated into new superfamilies: Cheiragonidae into Cheiragonoidea, Corystidae into Corystoidea, and both Pirimelidae and Thiidae into Portunoidea. Montezumellidae has been moved from Cancroidea to his own Superfamily Montezumelloidea Ossó & Domínguez, 2019 (Zootaxa, 4623 (1): 175–188).

References

 
Crabs
Arthropod superfamilies